The Kilpatrick Hills are a range of hills in central Scotland, stretching from Dumbarton in the west to Strathblane in the east. Strathblane divides the Kilpatricks from the Campsie Fells to the east, while to the north is part of the Loch Lomond and the Trossachs National Park. To west and south the hills are fringed by the settlements of Balloch, Dumbarton, Milton, Bowling, Old Kilpatrick, Clydebank, Bearsden and Milngavie. The majority of the range is within West Dunbartonshire, although it extends into the East Dunbartonshire and Stirling areas.

The highest points in the range are Duncolm and Fynloch. The Kilpatricks offer a number of viewpoints and places of interest: among the best known are Doughnot Hill and The Whangie. The area features several reservoirs.

The hills are of volcanic origin, modified by subsequent glaciation.

Geology 

The Kilpatrick Hills are a part of the Clyde Plateau Lavas.  These are about 340 million years old. Basaltic types of rocks (lavas, tuffs and agglomerates) predominate here.  These are produced by denudation of the successive flows.

The Whangie in the north of the Kilpatricks is of particular interest to geologists and casual walkers alike. It consists of a slice of the hillside that has been separated from the main slope. It has commonly been explained as result of glacial plucking, but more recent research indicates that a translational landslide was the cause. During an ice age, a glacier slowly undermined the crag, opening up cracks in the rock and causing this chasm to form.

The etymology of the Whangie's name is obscure but it might derive from the old Scots for slice (as in whang o' cheese).  Local folklore suggests that it was created by the devil flicking his tail as he flew past.

Archaeological sites
There are several archaeological sites on the south-facing slopes of the hills. There are three other cairns, which may be from the Bronze Age period. One known as Maidens Paps is nearby, just to the east of Jaw Reservoir which abuts Cochno Loch. Cists have been found at Cochno and Duntocher, and on the slopes below  several groups of cup and ring marks have been found on outcrops, mostly around Auchnacraig and Whitehill, with other groups further west along the slopes to above Bowling, West Dunbartonshire.

Topology and toponymy 

The hills are named after the village of Old Kilpatrick, which lies at their southern foot.

See also
 List of mountains in Scotland
 Maiden Paps (disambiguation)
Breast shaped hills

References 
 Gordon Brown local legend of Brown Hill. Remember pay your coin of homeage

External links

Cycling the Trossachs
Scottish Place Names

Hills of the Scottish Midland Valley
Protected areas of West Dunbartonshire
Mountains and hills of West Dunbartonshire
Mountain ranges of Scotland